Success Hill railway station is a Transperth railway station 11.6 km from Perth railway station, in Western Australia, on the Midland Line.

History
The station was opened in 1960 to service football fans.

Rail services
Success Hill railway station is served by the Midland railway line on the Transperth network. This line goes between Midland railway station and Perth railway station. Midland line trains stop at the station every 12 minutes during peak on weekdays, and every 15 minutes during the day outside peak every day of the year except Christmas Day. Trains are half-hourly or hourly at night time. The station saw 47,028 passengers in the 2013-14 financial year.

The station is the recommended stop for those attending WAFL games at Steel Blue Oval, the home stadium of the Swan Districts Football Club.

Bus routes

References

External links
Success Hill Train Station layout, Transperth

Midland line, Perth
Railway stations in Australia opened in 1960
Railway stations in Perth, Western Australia